Hexanitrohexaazaisowurtzitane, also called HNIW and CL-20, is a polycyclic nitroamine explosive with the formula C6H6N12O12.  In the 1980s, CL-20 was developed by the China Lake facility, primarily to be used in propellants. It has a better oxidizer-to-fuel ratio than conventional HMX or RDX. It releases 20% more energy than traditional HMX-based propellants, and is widely superior to conventional high-energy propellants and explosives.

While most development of CL-20 has been fielded by the Thiokol Corporation, the US Navy (through ONR) has also been interested in CL-20 for use in rocket propellants, such as for missiles, as it has lower observability characteristics such as less visible smoke.

CL-20 has not yet been fielded in any production weapons system, but is undergoing testing for stability, production capabilities, and other weapons characteristics.

Synthesis 

First, benzylamine (1) is condensed with glyoxal (2) under acidic and dehydrating conditions to yield the first intermediate compound.(3).  Four benzyl groups selectively undergo hydrogenolysis using palladium on carbon and hydrogen. The amino groups are then acetylated during the same step using acetic anhydride as the solvent. (4). Finally, compound 4 is reacted with nitronium tetrafluoroborate and nitrosonium tetrafluoroborate, resulting in HNIW.

Cocrystal product with HMX
In August 2012, Onas Bolton et al. published results showing that a cocrystal of 2 parts CL-20 and 1 part HMX had similar safety properties to HMX, but with a greater firing power closer to CL-20.

Cocrystal product with TNT
In August 2011, Adam Matzger and Onas Bolton published results showing that a cocrystal of CL-20 and TNT had twice the stability of CL-20—safe enough to transport, but when heated to  the cocrystal may separate into liquid TNT and a crystal form of CL-20 with structural defects that is somewhat less stable than CL-20.

CL-20 covalent chains and networks
In 2017, K.P. Katin and M.M. Maslov designed one-dimensional covalent chains based on the CL-20 molecules. Such chains were constructed using CH2 molecular bridges for the covalent bonding between the isolated CL-20 fragments. It was theoretically predicted that their stability increased with efficient length growth. A year later, M.A. Gimaldinova and colleagues demonstrated the versatility of CH2 molecular bridges. It is shown that the use of CH2 bridges is the universal technique to connect both CL-20 fragments in the chain and the chains together to make a network (linear or zigzag). It is confirmed that the increase of the effective sizes and dimensionality of the CL-20 covalent systems leads to their thermodynamic stability growth. Therefore, the formation of CL-20 crystalline covalent solids seems to be energetically favorable, and CL-20 molecules are capable of forming not only molecular crystals but bulk covalent structures as well. Numerical calculations of CL-20 chains and networks' electronic characteristics revealed that they were wide-bandgap semiconductors.

See also
 2,4,6-Tris(trinitromethyl)-1,3,5-triazine
 4,4’-Dinitro-3,3’-diazenofuroxan (DDF)
 Heptanitrocubane (HNC)
 HHTDD
 Iceane (Wurtzitane)
 Octanitrocubane (ONC)
 RE factor
 TEX (explosive)

References

Further reading 

 
 Lowe, Derek (11 November 2011) "Things I won't work with: Hexanitrohexaazaisowurtzitane"

Explosive chemicals
Nitroamines
Rocket fuels